Ko Tong Ha Yeung or simply Ha Yeung is a village of in the Sai Kung North area of Tai Po District, Hong Kong.

Administration
Ha Yeung is a recognized village under the New Territories Small House Policy.

See also
 Ko Tong

References

External links

 Delineation of area of existing village Ha Yeung (Sai Kung North) for election of resident representative (2019 to 2022)

Villages in Tai Po District, Hong Kong
Sai Kung North